The 1954 Cupa României was the 17th edition of Romania's most prestigious football cup competition.

The trophy was won by Metalul Reșița for the first time in history. It was also the first time when a team from the second division of Romanian football won the trophy.

Format
The competition is an annual knockout tournament.

In the first round proper, two pots were made, first pot with Divizia A teams and other teams till 16 and the second pot with the rest of teams qualified in this phase. First pot teams will play away. Each tie is played as a single leg.

If a match is drawn after 90 minutes, the game goes in extra time, and if the scored is still tight after 120 minutes, the team who plays away will qualify.

In case the teams are from same city, there a replay will be played.

In case the teams play in the final, there a replay will be played.

From the first edition, the teams from Divizia A entered in competition in sixteen finals, rule which remained till today.

Divizia A Teams

The following list represent the teams who played in 1954 Divizia A, which qualified directly in sixteen finals or first round proper.

Flamura Roşie Arad 
CCA București 
Dinamo București 
Locomotiva Timişoara 
Ştiinţa Cluj 
Știința Timișoara 
Flacăra Ploieşti

Dinamo Oraşul Stalin 
Minerul Petroşani 
Locomotiva Târgu Mureş 
Metalul Hunedoara 
Locomotiva București 
Metalul Câmpia Turzii 
Progresul Oradea

First round proper

|colspan=3 style="background-color:#FFCCCC;"|11 August 1954
 
 

 
 

 

 
 

|-
|colspan=3 style="background-color:#FFCCCC;"|12 August 1954 
 
|-
|colspan=3 style="background-color:#FFCCCC;"|18 August 1954 

|}

Second round proper

|colspan=3 style="background-color:#FFCCCC;"|20 October 1954 
 
 
 
 
 
 
 

|}

Quarter-finals 

|colspan=3 style="background-color:#FFCCCC;"|28 November 1954  
 
 
 
 
|}

Semi-finals

|colspan=3 style="background-color:#FFCCCC;"|1 December 1954  
  

|}

Final

References

External links
 romaniansoccer.ro
 Official site
 The Romanian Cup on the FRF's official site

Cupa României seasons
1953–54 in Romanian football
Romania